Ishaya Iko Ibrahim   (19 September 1952 – 4 January 2022) was the 18th Chief of the Nigerian Naval Staff. He was flag officer commanding Naval training command and Naval western command before his appointment as Chief of Naval Staff in August 2008.

Background and early life
Admiral Ibrahim was born in Jaba local government in Kaduna State. He spent and grew up in Kwoi where he had his primary education. He finished his secondary education in S.I.M Secondary School in Kagoro.
He Joined the Navy as a member of the 14th regular combatant course.

Career
Rear Admiral I.I Ishaya Served as the Chairman Board of Directors, National Inland Waterways Authority (NIWA), Lokoja
Admiral Ibrahim served on board several ships, He was the deputy defence attaché in Cotonou, Republic of Benin.

Personal life
Admiral Ibrahim was Married to Mrs Grace Ibrahim and they have six children.

References

1952 births
Chiefs of Naval Staff (Nigeria)
Living people
People from Kaduna State